Claire A. Celsi (born August 17, 1966) is a member of the Iowa Senate, representing Senate District 21 in Central Iowa. A member of the Democratic Party, Celsi has served as senator since 2019. She owns a marketing and public relations firm, The Public Relations Project, incorporated in 2009.

Elections 
Celsi defeated Democrat Connie Ryan in the June 5, 2018 primary and went on to defeat Republican Brian Bales in the November 5, 2018 General Election. Celsi's campaign positions included opposing state funding for homeschooling, state tracking and monitoring of homeschooled students, increasing state spending on public primary schools by four percent per year, and opposing Medicaid privatization.

Senator Celsi ran for reelection in Senate district 16, after the 2021 redistricting process redrew the district. Senator Sarah Trone Garriott was also drawn into the new district 16, but moved to neighboring Dallas County to run in the new Senate district 14.

Celsi's opponent in the 2022 general election was Bradley D. Price of West Des Moines. Price won the Senate District 16 Republican primary by 25 votes. The vote totals were 1576 for Price to 1551 for Shad Clayton.

Senator Celsi won the 2022 general election, 58% to 42% percent, beating Republican candidate Bradley D. Price of West Des Moines, according to unofficial results.

Biography 
Celsi graduated in 1984 from Dowling Catholic High School in West Des Moines, Iowa, She received her B.A. in sociology, cum laude, from Drake University. Celsi was appointed to the Iowa Alcoholic Beverages Commission on May 10, 2010 and served for five years, including one year as chair. Celsi previously served on the Iowa Great Places Advisory Board in the Cultural Affairs Department.

Claire Celsi is a small business owner, community volunteer and member of several community groups, boards and commissions, including the FADSS Council,</ref>, the Drake University Journalism and Mass Communications National Board of Directors Celsi is also a member of the Historic Valley Junction Foundation Board of Directors.

References

External links 
  at Iowa State Senate

1966 births
Living people
21st-century American politicians
21st-century American women politicians
Politicians from Des Moines, Iowa
People from West Des Moines, Iowa
Drake University alumni
Women state legislators in Iowa
Democratic Party Iowa state senators